is a former Japanese football player.

Playing career
Takasu was born in Saitama on September 6, 1981. He joined newly was promoted to J2 League club, Mito HollyHock from Kashima Antlers youth team in 2000. Although he played several matches, he could hardly play in the match until 2001. In 2002, he moved to Prefectural Leagues club Thespa Kusatsu. He played many matches and scored many goals in 2003 and the club was promoted to Regional Leagues from 2003 and Japan Football League (JFL) from 2004. Although the club was promoted to J2 from 2005, his opportunity to play decreased for injury from 2004. In 2006, he moved to JFL club Arte Takasaki and played in 2 seasons. In 2008, he moved to Prefectural Leagues club Tonan Maebashi. He retired in 2009.

Club statistics

References

External links

1981 births
Living people
Association football people from Saitama Prefecture
Japanese footballers
J2 League players
Japan Football League players
Mito HollyHock players
Thespakusatsu Gunma players
Arte Takasaki players
Association football midfielders